Bryson Djuan Tiller (born January 2, 1993) is an American singer, songwriter, and rapper. Born in Louisville, Kentucky, he began his career in 2011 with a mixtape entitled Killer Instinct Vol. 1. Tiller initially gained mainstream success in 2015 following the release of the single, "Don't", which reached the top 20 on the Billboard Hot 100.

The record's success led to a deal with RCA Records and served as the lead single to his debut studio album, Trapsoul (2015), which reached the top ten on the Billboard 200, and included the single "Exchange", which earned him a Grammy Award nomination. In May 2017, Tiller released his second studio album, True to Self, which debuted at number-one on the Billboard 200. That same year, he was also featured alongside Rihanna on the hit single "Wild Thoughts" by DJ Khaled, which reached number-two on the Billboard Hot 100.

Tiller has received multiple accolades, including two BET Awards for Best New Artist and Best Male R&B/Pop Artist; and in March 2016, he received the key to the city from Louisville Mayor Greg Fischer.

Early life 
Bryson Tiller was born on January 2, 1993, in Louisville, Kentucky. When he was four years old, his mother died and he was subsequently raised by his grandmother. Tiller lived with his cousins, Ryan and Kevon Smekrud, until he was 17 years old. He has three brothers. He attended Iroquois High School and started singing and rapping at the age of 15. In 2011, he recorded a mixtape titled Killer Instinct Vol.1, which included 21 songs. In 2013, Tiller dropped out of school, had a child and took a break from music while working at Papa John's Pizza and UPS to provide for his daughter, Harley.

Career

2014–2016: Breakthrough and Trapsoul 

In October 2014, Tiller uploaded his debut single "Don't" to his SoundCloud account, which started receiving some internet attention from music industry insiders. It was officially released on iTunes for digital download in May 2015, becoming the lead single of his debut studio album. "Don't" peaked at number 13 on the Billboard Hot 100 chart. It has been remixed by artists like K Camp, Mila J, Sevyn Streeter, DRAM and WSTRN. Early co-signs from record producer Timbaland and rapper Drake led to major-label attention for Tiller, with him eventually choosing to sign a record deal with RCA Records, which was announced on August 25, 2015. Tiller was offered a chance to sign with Drake's OVO Sound record label, but declined the offer. In September 2015, Rolling Stone included Tiller in their list of "10 New Artists You Need to Know".

On October 2, 2015, Tiller released his debut studio album, Trapsoul, which debuted at number 11 on the US Billboard 200 and later reached number eight. The album's second single, "Exchange", peaked at number 26 on the Billboard Hot 100 and earned him a Grammy nomination for Best R&B Song. "Sorry Not Sorry", which was released as the third single from Trapsoul, peaked at number 67 on the Billboard Hot 100. The album was included on a number of 2015 year-end lists, such as Complex's The Best Albums of 2015, The Roots 10 Favorite Albums of 2015, and PopSugar's The 24 Best Albums of 2015. In 2015, he also co-wrote the track "Proof" for singer Chris Brown's seventh studio album Royalty.

In January 2016, Tiller started the Trapsoul Tour for the promotion of the album, with opening act THEY. On March 12, 2016, Louisville Mayor Greg Fischer gave Tiller the key to the city and named March 12 as "Bryson Tiller Day". In May 2016, Tiller made his US television debut, performing "Exchange" on the Late Night with Seth Meyers show. On June 26, 2016, he performed at the BET Awards, where he also received the awards for Best New Artist and Best Male R&B/Pop Artist. In July 2016, DJ Khaled released his ninth studio album, Major Key, which includes the song "Ima Be Alright" featuring Tiller and rapper Future. In September 2016, Tiller also appeared on the track "First Take" by rapper Travis Scott, from Scott's second studio album, Birds in the Trap Sing McKnight.

2017–2018: True to Self 
In January 2017, he was included on Forbes magazine's "30 Under 30", a list showcasing entrepreneurs, entertainers and celebrities who have made a name for themselves before reaching the age of 30. In the same month Tiller announced that his second album will be titled True to Self. On April 12, 2017, Tiller tweeted that work on his second album, True to Self, had been wrapped up. On May 11, 2017, Tiller revealed the album artwork and that True to Self would be released on June 23, 2017. He also released three new songs, titled "Honey", "Somethin Tells Me" and "Get Mine", with the latter featuring rapper Young Thug. On May 26, he released True to Self, a month earlier than the intended release. The album debuted at number one on the Billboard 200, earning 107,000 album-equivalent units, of which 47,000 were pure album sales. It became Tiller's first number one album in the country.

In June 2017, Tiller partnered with Nike, Inc. to provide a new Wyandotte Park for children and teens. In the same month, DJ Khaled released "Wild Thoughts" featuring Tiller and singer Rihanna, which is the fourth single from his tenth studio album, Grateful. The single has peaked at number two on the Billboard Hot 100, as well as reaching number one on the UK Singles Chart. In August 2017, Tiller released a collaborative single with singer Jazmine Sullivan titled "Insecure", which is the title track for the HBO series Insecure. In January 2018, he performed "Wild Thoughts" with Rihanna and DJ Khaled at the 60th Annual Grammy Awards.

2019–present: Anniversary and A Different Christmas
Throughout 2019 and 2020, Tiller featured on a number of songs by other artists. In 2019, Tiller said he was waiting for sample clearances in order to release his album, titled Serenity. In April 2020, he released the song "Slept on You" via SoundCloud. On September 3, 2020, Tiller released "Inhale" and stated on his social media pages that he would release a new album in fall 2020. The second single "Always Forever", was released on September 23, with a deluxe edition of Trapsoul released on September 25, in celebration of his third album, Anniversary, which was released  on October 2, 2020. It marked the five year anniversary of his debut album and includes a guest feature from Drake. The deluxe of Anniversary was released on February 26, 2021, featuring an additional five new tracks and a feature from Big Sean.

On October 8, 2020, Travis Scott premiered an unreleased song with Tiller titled "Blunt Talk" on an episode of Scott and his DJ Chase B's .Wav radio on Apple Music.

On October 31, 2021, Tiller released a mixtape, Killer Instinct Vol. 2, on a private link that he texted to his fans using his community number he had made earlier in 2020.

On November 10, 2021, Tiller announced his first Christmas album, A Different Christmas released on November 19. Tiller said the project was inspired by Ariana Grande and Justin Bieber, the latter of whom features on a song titled "Lonely Christmas". Tiller's daughter Halo also appears on the closing track.

On September 8, 2022, Tiller released a new single titled “Outside,” which samples The Ying Yang Twins 2005 hit single “Wait (The Whisper Song).” On October 18, 2022, Tiller released a music video for the single which featured an appearance from The Ying Yang Twins.

Artistry

Influences 

Tiller has cited singer Omarion as his mega influence, "[My uncle] put me on Omarion's first album, and that was the first album that made me want to start singing. I started listening to him daily and singing what I heard." Singer The-Dream has inspired him becoming a lyricist, "I started listening to The-Dream a lot. That's when I really got into writing songs. I like the way he put lyrics and makes his songs. So I was like, all right, and I just started writing. That's when I started wanting to be a songwriter. I never really wanted to be an artist. I just really wanted to write songs. But of course I can't get placement unless I demo the songs."

His other influences include R. Kelly, Lil Wayne, Chris Brown and Drake. In addition, Tiller listed Jazmine Sullivan, Usher, Rihanna, Beyoncé, Jay-Z, The Notorious B.I.G. and Mary J. Blige as impactful to his musical socialization.

Musical style 
Tiller has described his music as "trap and hip hop-influenced R&B, the perfect marriage between hip hop and R&B." Tiller also raps saying "there are some things I can say rapping that I can't say singing". Critics have compared Tiller's musical style to Drake, Jeremih, PartyNextDoor and Tory Lanez. During the recording of True to Self, Tiller struggled with depression, which according to him can be heard in the music and was the reason of the album's disappointing commercial performance. On his blend of R&B and rap, Tiller explained: "R&B is my first love and it always will be. I fell in love with hip-hop and rap music through Lil Wayne. Don't get me wrong, I love Wayne, but you know, I heard only the radio singles [..] So I said, 'Damn. Let me mix it up a little bit".

Public image 

Tiller has stated he will "probably never" do video interviews, because he wants to be a "shadowy figure". According to Justin Charity of The Ringer, "Tiller's lack of a full-time public persona is one of the young R&B singer's most endearing qualities".

Personal life 
Tiller has two daughters, born in 2013 and 2019. As of 2018, he is in a relationship with Kendra Bailey, the mother of his second child. Tiller graduated high school in June 2020, through Iroquois High School in his hometown of Louisville, Kentucky. He shared on Twitter: "I never thought about going back to school until I started thinking about my goals and how to reach them. Getting my High School diploma was step 1".

Awards and nominations

Discography 

Trapsoul (2015)
 True to Self (2017)
 Anniversary (2020)
 Serenity (2023)

Tours 
Headlining
 Trapsoul Tour (2016)
 Set It Off Tour (2017)
Supporting
Starboy: Legend of the Fall Tour  (2017)

See also 
List of awards and nominations received by Bryson Tiller

References

External links 

 
 
 Offiical Instagram 

1993 births
Living people
21st-century African-American male singers
21st-century American rappers
African-American male rappers
African-American male singer-songwriters
American hip hop singers
American contemporary R&B singers
Iroquois High School alumni
Musicians from Louisville, Kentucky
Rappers from Kentucky
RCA Records artists
Singer-songwriters from Kentucky
Southern hip hop musicians
Trap musicians
Twitch (service) streamers